Beautiful Offerings is the seventh studio album by Big Daddy Weave. Word Records alongside Curb Records and Fervent Records released the album on September 18, 2015.

Critical reception

Awarding the album four stars from CCM Magazine, Jamie Walker states, "Beautiful Offerings features eleven originals that continue the band's tradition of offering rich melodic hooks perfectly paired with thought-provoking and worshipful lyrics...With Beautiful Offerings, Big Daddy Weave once again powerfully presents in their own unique way the live-giving messages of hope and surrender." Kevin Davis, giving the album four and a half stars at New Release Today, writes, "This new album demonstrates once again the passion and energy that have made Big Daddy Weave one of Christian music's most compelling acts...These are very passionate worship songs with biblically based lyrics sung with vocal sincerity and reverence...This album is Big Daddy Weave's crowning achievement and one of my top albums of the year."

Indicating in a four and a half star review by Worship Leader, Randy Cross responds, "Beautiful Offerings is the next 'classic' from the band that continues to define what it is to be a Christian pop artist...Sometimes introspective, always deep and worshipful, Beautiful Offerings is an unadulterated celebration of the band's relationship with Jesus". Rating the album three stars from Jesus Freak Hideout, Alex Caldwell describes, "The early songs on Beautiful Offerings show that Big Daddy Weave can stretch the boundaries of their sound when they want to, but half of the songs here sound like they could have been performed by ten other bands."

Joshua Andre, indicating in a four and a half star review for 365 Days of Inspiring Media, recognizes, "Beautiful Offerings is one of the stand out albums of the year, in my opinion, as well as the band’s most complete and mature work to date, with plenty of genres encompassed throughout." Signaling in a four and a half star review by The Christian Beat, Abby Baracskai replies, "Big Daddy Weave continues to deliver new and creative arrangements, powerful lyrics and compelling vocals with Beautiful Offerings."

Track listing

Personnel 

Big Daddy Weave
 Mike Weaver – lead and backing vocals, acoustic guitars
 Jeremy Redmon – keyboard programming, electric guitars, banjo, mandolin, additional drums, trumpet, backing vocals
 Joe Shirk – keyboards, saxophone, backing vocals 
 Jay Weaver – bass, backing vocals 
 Brian Beihl – drums, percussion, backing vocals

Additional Musicians
 Matt Gilder – keyboards (1-8, 10, 13)
 David Leonard – keyboards (1, 4, 6-9, 11), backing vocals (3, 6-10, 14)
 Ben Phillips – drums (1-11, 13)
 Matt Nelson – cello (2)
 The Love Sponge Strings – strings (1, 2, 12, 14)
 Luke Brown – backing vocals (1, 4, 5, 6, 8, 10, 13)
 Anna Redmon – backing vocals (1, 2)
 Benji Cowart – backing vocals (11)

Production 
 Jeremy Redmon – producer 
 Tedd T – additional producer (11)
 Josh Bailey – A&R 
 Ben Phillips – tracking engineer 
 Ainslie Grosser – mixing 
 Dan Shike – mastering 
 Shane Tarleton – creative director 
 Katherine Petillo – art direction, design 
 David Molnar – photography

Charts

Awards and nominations
In 2016, 'My Story' was nominated for a Dove Award for 'Pop/Contemporary Recorded Song of the Year'.

References

2015 albums
Big Daddy Weave albums
Word Records albums
Fervent Records albums
Curb Records albums